Ecclesiogyra is a genus of predatory sea snails, marine prosobranch gastropod mollusks in the family Epitoniidae, commonly known as wentletraps.

Species
According to the World Register of Marine Species, the following species with valid names are included within the genus Ecclesiogyra :
 Eccliseogyra aethiopica (Thiele, 1925)
 Eccliseogyra brasiliensis Garcia, 2011
 Eccliseogyra exquisita Bouchet & Warén, 1986
 Eccliseogyra folini (Dautzenberg & de Boury, 1897)
 Eccliseogyra formosissima (Jeffreys, 1884)
 Eccliseogyra fragilissima (Schepman, 1909)
 Eccliseogyra frausseni L. G. Brown, 2019
 Eccliseogyra jungcheni K.-Y. Lai, 2018
 Eccliseogyra maracatu S. Lima & Christoffersen, 2013
 Eccliseogyra monnioti Bouchet & Warén, 1986
 Eccliseogyra nitida (Verrill & S. Smith [in Verrill], 1885)
 Eccliseogyra performosa (de Boury, 1917)
 Eccliseogyra pyrrhias (R. B. Watson, 1886)
 Eccliseogyra sericea Bouchet & Warén, 1986
Species brought into synonymy 
 Eccliseogyra capitata (Thiele, 1925) : synonym of Scala capitata Thiele, 1925
 Eccliseogyra carchedon (Iredale, 1936) : synonym of Epitonium carchedon (Iredale, 1936)
 Eccliseogyra dissoluta (Locard, 1897) : synonym of Eccliseogyra nitida (Verrill & S. Smith [in Verrill], 1885)
 Eccliseogyra gratissima (Thiele, 1925) : synonym of Amaea gratissima (Thiele, 1925)
 Eccliseogyra laxatoides Kuroda, 1995 : synonym of Cycloscala laxatoides (Nakayama, 1995)
 Eccliseogyra nebulosa Dall, 1919 : synonym of Amaea brunneopicta (Dall, 1908)
 Eccliseogyra striatissima (Monterosato, 1878) : synonym of Epitonium striatissimum (Monterosato, 1878)

References

External links
 Dall W.H. (1892). Contributions to the Tertiary fauna of Florida with especial reference to the Miocene silex-beds of Tampa and the Pliocene beds of the Caloosahatchie River. 2. Streptodont and other gastropods, concluded. Transactions of the Wagner Free Institute of Science, Philadelphia. 3(2): 201-473
 Brown L.G. & Neville B.D. (2015). Catalog of the recent taxa of the families Epitoniidae and Nystiellidae (Mollusca: Gastropoda) with a bibliography of the descriptive and systematic literature. Zootaxa. 3907(1): 1-188
  Serge GOFAS, Ángel A. LUQUE, Joan Daniel OLIVER,José TEMPLADO & Alberto SERRA (2021) - The Mollusca of Galicia Bank (NE Atlantic Ocean); European Journal of Taxonomy 785: 1–114

Epitoniidae